Guan Tong (c. 906-960) was a Chinese painter of the Northern Landscape style during the Five Dynasties and Ten Kingdoms period and early Song dynasty from the city of Chang'an. He was a pupil of Jing Hao, and known as a critical figure in the development of the era's monumental landscape painting. His landscape paintings achieved a believable and compelling portrayal of the natural world, an achievement typifying the tenth-century artists drive in the portrayal of nature.  The great popularity Guan's distinctive style achieved is one measure of the popularity of landscape painting at the time.

Autumn Mountain Shadow is one of the paintings attributed to Guan Tong, and although there are several works attributed to him, there are no extant works bearing his signature. In this picture a barely visible steep path climbs through the rugged mountains. The work appears to be the visual equivalent of the poems describing hard journeys such as Li Bai's The Road to Shu is Hard (Shudao nan). Guan's works focus also on the representation of the cyclical seasons of nature: a concept central to Chinese medicine and many schools of Chinese philosophy.

Guan Tong favored the use of 'axe chopped' brushstrokes, Fu Pi Cun, to depict the angular rocky forms of the northern mountains. His strong peaks and densely compacted composition represents the northern tradition in its most likely form as scholars understand it today. Scholars describe Guan's works, along with certain pieces by his teacher Jing Hao, as advanced and impressive pieces for their era, and not works that should be counted as inferior or preliminary to the mature landscape art of the Song.

Twentieth-century artist Chang Dai-chien forged a painting which was successfully passed off as an original by Guan Tong; the painting was purchased by the Museum of Fine Arts, Boston in 1957 and was assumed, at the time, to be a work by Guan Tong. The painting is considered one of Chang's most ambitious and audacious forgeries.

Notes

References
Barnhart, Richard M. et al. (1997). Three Thousand Years of Chinese Painting. New Haven: Yale University Press. .
Zhongguo gu dai shu hua jian ding zu. 1999. Zhongguo hui hua quan ji. Zhongguo mei shu fen lei quan ji. Beijing: Wen wu chu ban she. Volume 2.

External links
Landscapes Clear and Radiant: The Art of Wang Hui (1632-1717), an exhibition catalog from The Metropolitan Museum of Art (fully available online as PDF), which contains material on Guan Tong (see index)

Five Dynasties and Ten Kingdoms landscape painters
Later Liang (Five Dynasties) painters
Artists from Xi'an
Painters from Shaanxi
10th-century Chinese painters
900s births
960 deaths
Year of birth uncertain